Count Aldo Maria Brachetti-Peretti  (born in Fermo on September 18, 1932), from a prominent family of the Marche, is chairman of the Italian company, API Group.

Bibliography
He took his degree in economics and began working at API in 1957, while teaching economics and banking at the Universities of Rome and Parma. In 1965 he joined the board of directors and, in 1974, he was appointed Executive Vice-President and CEO of API. In 1977, he was appointed President and CEO.

In 1978 he received the honor of "Cavaliere del Lavoro" from the President of Italy.

On October 6, 2009 he received an honorary degree in Engineering.
Presently he is Chairman of API Holding S.p.A. and of the Unione Petrolifera and one of the most important producers of Bordeaux wines in Europe, with his own vineyard called “Il Pollenza”.

He is the father of Ugo Brachetti Peretti and Ferdinando Brachetti Peretti.

References

1932 births
Living people
People from Fermo
Italian businesspeople